El Hincha may refer to:

 The Fan (1951 film), a 1951 Argentine sports comedy film
 The Fan (1958 film), a 1958 Spanish comedy sports film